The Florida Cracker Horse is a breed of horse from the state of Florida in the United States. It is genetically and physically similar to many other Spanish-style horses, especially those from the Spanish Colonial horse group. The Florida Cracker is a gaited breed known for its agility and speed. The Spanish first brought horses to Florida with their expeditions in the early 16th century; as colonial settlement progressed, they used the horses for herding cattle. These horses developed into the Florida Cracker type seen today, and continued to be used by Florida cowboys (known as "crackers") until the 1930s.

At this point they were superseded by American Quarter Horses needed to work larger cattle brought to Florida during the Dust Bowl, and population numbers declined precipitously. Through the efforts of several private families and the Florida government, the breed was saved from extinction, but there is still concern about its low numbers. Both The Livestock Conservancy and the Equus Survival Trust consider breed numbers to be at a critical point.

Characteristics
The Florida Cracker Horse is also known by a variety of other names and descriptions, including Chickasaw pony, Seminole pony, Prairie pony, Florida horse, Florida cow pony and grass-gut. They are found mainly in bay, black, and gray, although grullo, dun, and chestnut are also seen. Roan and pinto colors are occasionally found. They have straight or slightly concave profiles, strong backs and sloping croups. They are known for their speed and agility and excel at trail and endurance riding, and are also used extensively as stock horses. They are sometimes seen in Western riding sports such as working cow horse, team roping, and team penning. The Florida Cracker is a gaited horse, with the breed association recognizing two gaits, the running walk and amble, in addition to the regular walk, trot, canter and gallop. The single-footed ambling gait is known as the "coon rack" by some breed enthusiasts. The foundation genetics of the breed are the same as many others developed from Spanish stock in North and South America, including the Paso Fino, Peruvian Paso, and Criollo. The Cracker horse is very similar in type and genetics to the Carolina Marsh Tacky and the Banker horse, both Spanish-style breeds from the eastern United States, but DNA testing has proven that these are separate breeds.

History
Horses first arrived on the southeast North American mainland in 1521, brought by Ponce de León on his second trip to the region, where they were used by officers, scouts, and livestock herders. Later expeditions brought more horses and cattle to Spanish Florida. By the late 16th century, horses were used extensively in the local cattle business, and by the late 17th century the industry was flourishing, especially in what is now northern Florida and southern Georgia. The horses brought to North America by the Spanish and subsequently bred there included Barbs, Garranos, Spanish Jennets, Sorraias, Andalusians, and other Iberian breeds. Overall, they were relatively small and had physical traits distinctive of Spanish breeds, including short backs, sloping shoulders, low set tails, and wide foreheads.

The early cattle drivers, nicknamed Florida crackers and Georgia crackers, used these Spanish-ancestry horses to drive cattle (eventually known as Florida Cracker cattle). The cowboys were said to have received their nickname from the distinctive cracking of their whips, though modern etymology actually traces the term to a mostly obsolete word for 'braggart' or 'loudmouth'. The name was transferred to both the horses they rode and the cattle they herded. Through their primary use as stock horses, the type developed into the Florida Cracker horse, known for its speed, endurance and agility. From the mid-16th century to the 1930s, this type was the predominant horse in the southeastern United States. During the American Civil War (1861–1865), both belligerents purchased large amounts of beef from Florida, and the Spanish horses bred there were highly desired as riding horses. During this time, there was also a continual introduction of new Spanish blood from Cuba, as horses were traded between the two areas.  During the Dust Bowl (1930–1940), large western cattle were moved into Florida, bringing with them the parasitic screwworm. Cattle with this parasite needed to be treated frequently. The cowboys found that the Florida Cracker horses, bred for working smaller cattle, were not able to hold the western cattle. They replaced the smaller horses with American Quarter Horses. This resulted in the Florida breed almost becoming extinct.

20th century

The breed's survival during the 20th century is owed to a few families who continued to breed the Cracker horse and kept distinct bloodlines alive. John Law Ayers was one such breeder; in 1984, he donated his herd of pure-bred Cracker horses to the state of Florida. With them, the state started three small herds in Tallahassee, Withlacoochee State Forest, and Paynes Prairie State Preserve. By 1989, however, these three herds and around 100 other horses owned by private families were all that remained of the breed. In 1989 the Florida Cracker Horse Association was founded and in 1991 a registry was established. After the registry was created, 75 horses designated as "foundation horses" and 14 of their offspring were immediately registered. These horses came mainly from four lines of Cracker bloodstock and were designated as purebreds by breed experts – partbred horses were denied entry to the registry. As of 2009, around 900 horses had been registered since the foundation of the registry.

Effective July 1, 2008, the Florida House of Representatives declared the Florida Cracker Horse the official state horse. As of 2009 there are three main bloodlines of Cracker stock, as well as a few smaller lines. The state of Florida still maintains two groups of Ayers-line horses in Tallahassee and Withlacoochee for breeding purposes and a display group in the Paynes Prairie Preserve. The state annually sells excess horses from all three herds, and individual breeders also send horses to the sale. The Livestock Conservancy considers the breed to be at "critical" status, as part of the Colonial Spanish horse family, meaning that the estimated global population of the breed is fewer than 2,000 and there are fewer than 200 registrations annually in the United States. The Equus Survival Trust also considers the population to be "critical," meaning that there are between 100 and 300 active adult breeding mares in existence today. However, breed numbers are slowly on the rise.

Chickasaw horse
The original Chickasaw horse, bred by the Chickasaw Indians using horses captured from De Soto's expedition, became extinct after being used to create the Florida Cracker Horse and having some influence on the Quarter Horse. Some sources still use the Chickasaw name to describe the Florida Cracker Horses of today. In the 1970s, there was a surge of interest in re-creating the Chickasaw, using horses bearing strong resemblances to the original breed, but this has since died out and the breed association no longer exists.

References

External links

 The Florida Cracker Horse Association
 Florida Cracker Horses at Florida-Backroads-Travel.com

Conservation Priority Breeds of the Livestock Conservancy
Florida cracker culture
Horse breeds
Horse breeds originating in the United States
Horse breeds originating from Indigenous Americans
Symbols of Florida